Falstaff (Chimes at Midnight) (Spanish: Campanadas a medianoche) is a 1966 period comedy-drama film directed by and starring Orson Welles. The Spanish-Swiss co-production was released in the United States as Chimes at Midnight and in most of Europe as Falstaff. The film's plot centres on William Shakespeare's recurring character Sir John Falstaff and the father-son relationship he has with Prince Hal, who must choose between loyalty to his father, King Henry IV, or Falstaff.

Welles said that the core of the film's story was "the betrayal of friendship." It stars Welles as Falstaff, Keith Baxter as Prince Hal, John Gielgud as Henry IV, Jeanne Moreau as Doll Tearsheet and Margaret Rutherford as Mistress Quickly. The script contains text from five of Shakespeare's plays; primarily Henry IV, Part 1 and Henry IV, Part 2, but also Richard II, Henry V, and The Merry Wives of Windsor. Ralph Richardson's narration is taken from the works of chronicler Raphael Holinshed.

Welles had previously produced a Broadway stage adaptation of nine Shakespeare plays called Five Kings in 1939. In 1960, he revived this project in Ireland as Chimes at Midnight, which was his final on-stage performance. Neither of these plays was successful, but Welles considered portraying Falstaff to be his life's ambition and turned the project into a film. In order to get initial financing, Welles lied to producer Emiliano Piedra about intending to make a version of Treasure Island, and keeping the film funded during its production was a constant struggle. Welles shot Chimes at Midnight throughout Spain between 1964 and 1965; it premiered at the 1966 Cannes Film Festival, winning two awards there.

Initially dismissed by most film critics, Chimes at Midnight is now regarded as one of Welles' highest achievements, and Welles himself called it his best work. Welles felt a strong connection to the character of Falstaff and called him "Shakespeare's greatest creation". Some film scholars and Welles' collaborators have made comparisons between Falstaff and Welles, while others see a resemblance between Falstaff and Welles' father. Disputes over the ownership of Chimes at Midnight made it difficult to view the film legally until recently. It was released in the UK on DVD and Blu-ray in 2015. A new restoration by Janus Films and The Criterion Collection was screened at the Film Forum in New York January 1–12, 2016. The Criterion Collection released the film on Blu-ray and DVD on August 30, 2016.

Plot 

The film opens with Sir John Falstaff and Justice Shallow walking through the snow, then to a warm fire inside Justice Shallow’s home in Gloucestershire, as the two reminisce. After a main credit sequence, the narrator explains that King Henry IV of England has succeeded Richard II, whom he has killed. "Some say at the command of the Duke Henry Bolingbrooke in Pontrefact castle on February 14, 1400." Richard II's true heir, Edmund Mortimer, is a prisoner in Wales, and Mortimer's cousins (the Percys) Northumberland, Worcester, and Northumberland's son Hotspur demand that Henry rescue Mortimer. The king refuses, and thus Mortimer's cousins, the Percys, begin to plot Henry's overthrow. To wit, Northumberland, his son Henry Percy (called "Hotspur") and Worcester.

To Henry's great dissatisfaction, his son Prince Hal spends most of his time at the Boar's Head Tavern, drinking and carousing with prostitutes, thieves and other criminals under Falstaff's patriarchal influence. Falstaff insists that he and Hal should think of themselves as gentlemen, but Hal warns Falstaff that he will one day reject both this lifestyle and Falstaff. The next morning Hal, Falstaff, Bardolph, Peto, and Poins disguise themselves in Gadshill to prepare to rob a group of traveling pilgrims. After Falstaff, Bardolph, and Peto rob the pilgrims, Hal and Poins jump out in disguises and take the stolen treasure from Falstaff as a joke.

Back at the Boar's Head Tavern, Falstaff begins to tell Hal and Poins with increasing exaggeration the story of how the money was stolen from him. Hal and Poins poke holes in Falstaff's tale until they reveal their joke to the entire group. In celebration of the newly recovered stolen treasure, Falstaff and Hal take turns impersonating Henry, with a cooking pot crown and vocal impressions. Falstaff's Henry chastises Hal for spending his time with common criminals, but names Sir John Falstaff as his one virtuous friend. Hal's Henry calls Falstaff a "misleader of youth".

Hal visits the King at the castle and Henry scolds him for his criminal and unethical life-style. Henry warns Hal about Hotspur's growing army and its threat to his crown. Hal passionately vows to his unimpressed father that he will defend Henry and redeem his good name. The King's army, including Falstaff, parades through the streets and off to war. Before the battle, Henry meets with Worcester and offers to forgive all of Hotspur's men of treason if they surrender immediately. Hal vows to personally kill Hotspur. Worcester returns to his camp and lies to Hotspur, telling him that Henry intends to execute all traitors. 

The two armies meet in the Battle of Shrewsbury (1403), but Falstaff hides in shrubs for most of the conflict. After a long and bloody fight, the King's men win the battle, after which Hotspur and Hal meet alone and duel; as Falstaff watches, Hal kills Hotspur. Henry sentences Worcester to death and takes his men as prisoners. Falstaff brings Hotspur's body to Henry, claiming that he killed Hotspur; Henry does not believe Falstaff, instead looking disapprovingly at Hal and the ignoble company he keeps. 

The narrator explains that all of Henry IV's rebellious enemies had been killed by 1408, but that Henry's health has begun to deteriorate. At the castle, Henry becomes upset when told that Hal is once again spending time with Falstaff, and collapses. Hal visits the castle and discovers that Henry is sicker than he had realized. Hal vows to Henry to be a good and noble king. Henry finally has faith in Hal and advises him on how to be a king. Henry dies and Hal tells his men that he is now King Henry V. 

Falstaff, Shallow and Silence sit in front of a warm fire, continuing from the first scene of the film. They receive news of Henry IV's death and that Hal's coronation will be held that morning. Falstaff becomes ecstatic and goes directly to the castle, thinking that he will become a great and powerful nobleman under King Henry V. At the coronation, Falstaff cannot contain his excitement and interrupts the entire ceremony, announcing himself to Hal. Hal turns his back on Falstaff and proclaims that he is now finished with his former lifestyle. As Falstaff looks up at Hal with a mixture of pride and despair, the new king banishes Falstaff. The coronation continues into the castle as Falstaff walks away, stating that he will be sent for that evening. That night, Falstaff dies at the Boar's Head Tavern, and his friends mourn him, saying that he died of a broken heart. The narrator explains that Hal went on to become a good and noble king.

Cast 

Orson Welles as Sir John Falstaff, a knight and father-figure to Prince Hal
Keith Baxter as Prince Hal, the Prince of Wales and the heir to the throne of England
John Gielgud as King Henry IV, the King of England
Margaret Rutherford as Mistress Quickly, hostess of the Boar's Head Tavern
Jeanne Moreau as Doll Tearsheet, a prostitute
Alan Webb as Justice Shallow, a country justice and old friend of Falstaff
Walter Chiari as Justice Silence, a country justice
Michael Aldridge as Pistol, a friend of Falstaff
Tony Beckley as Ned Poins, a friend of Falstaff and Hal
Charles Farrell as Bardolph, a friend of Falstaff and Hal
Patrick Bedford as Nym, a friend of Falstaff and Hal
José Nieto as Earl of Northumberland, an Earl in rebellion against the King, and cousin of Edmund Mortimer
Keith Pyott as the Lord Chief Justice
Fernando Rey as Earl of Worcester, Northumberland's brother, and cousin of Edmund Mortimer
Norman Rodway as Henry Percy, called Hotspur, Northumberland's son, and second cousin of Edmund Mortimer
Marina Vlady as Kate Percy, Hotspur's wife
Andrew Faulds as Earl of Westmorland, an Earl loyal to the King
Jeremy Rowe as Prince John, Henry IV's second son
Beatrice Welles as Falstaff's Page, a servant (Also played by Bruno Yasoni after Beatrice could not finish filming)
Fernando Hilbeck
Andrés Mejuto
Julio Peña
Ralph Richardson as The Narrator (voice)
Ingrid Pitt as Courtesan (uncredited)

Original stage productions 
Welles' inspiration for Chimes at Midnight began in 1930 when he was a student at the Todd School for Boys in Woodstock, Illinois. Welles tried to stage a three-and-a-half-hour combination of several of Shakespeare's historical plays called The Winter of Our Discontent in which he played Richard III. School officials forced him to make cuts to the production. Chimes at Midnight originated in 1939 as a stage play called  Five Kings, which Welles wrote and partially staged. It was an ambitious adaptation of several Shakespeare plays that chronicled the stories of Richard II, Henry IV, Henry V, Henry VI and Richard III. Its sources were Richard II, Henry IV, Part 1, Henry IV, Part 2, Henry V, The Merry Wives of Windsor, Henry VI, Part 1, Henry VI, Part 2, Henry VI, Part 3 and Richard IIIsometimes collectively called the "War of the Roses cycle". The grouping of Henry IV, Part 1, Henry IV, Part 2 and Henry V are often referred to as the Henriad.

Five Kings (1939) 

Five Kings was announced as part of the newly revived Mercury Theatre's second season in 1938. Welles' intended to stage only the first part of the playwhich was primarily taken from Henry IV Parts 1 and 2 and Henry Vduring the tour while simultaneously rehearsing Part Two and finally debuting the full production on Broadway. Houseman stated that the play's aim was "to combine the immediate quality of the Elizabethan with all the devices and techniques possible in the modern theatre." The cast included Welles as Falstaff, Burgess Meredith as Prince Hal, John Emery as Hotspur, Morris Ankrum as Henry IV and Robert Speaight as the Narrator. The play's music was composed by Aaron Copland. Welles commissioned an elaborate revolving set to be built, but it was not completed during the five weeks allotted to rehearsals.

Welles avoided attending the rehearsals or finishing the play's final script and instead often went out drinking and socializing with co-star Meredith, with the result that only specific scenes or fragments of the play were ever rehearsed. The Baltimore performance was eventually dropped and at the first dress rehearsal in Boston, it was discovered that the play was over five and a half hours long and contained 46 scenes. Welles cut 14 scenes and shortened others, which caused the built-in timer for the revolving set to move out of synchronization. Five Kings, Part 1 premiered at the Colonial Theatre in Boston on February 27, 1939, and was a disaster. Critics were either scathing or apologetic, and only the play's battle scenes received praise. By the end of the Boston run, the Theatre Guild was on the verge of dropping the production, and canceled the D.C. engagement. Welles then edited the show to three and a half hours. The play closed after only a few performances in Philadelphia, and the Theatre Guild terminated its contract with the Mercury Theater. Photographs of the play's rehearsals show similarities to Chimes at Midnight, including the Boar's Head Tavern set and the character blocking of the "chimes at midnight" scene with Falstaff, Shallow and Silence.

Chimes at Midnight (1960) 

Welles returned to the project in 1960, with performances in Belfast and Dublin. This version, now retitled Chimes at Midnight, was produced by Welles' old friend Hilton Edwards through his Dublin-based company Gate Theatre. The cast included Welles as Falstaff, Keith Baxter as Prince Hal, Hilton Edwards as the Narrator, Reginald Jarman as Henry IV and Alexis Kanner as Hotspur. At one point, Welles and Edwards wanted Micheál Mac Liammóir to replace Jarman as Henry IV, but Mac Liammóir would only accept the role of Prince Hal. Hilton Edwards was officially credited as director, but Welles is usually acknowledged as the actual director and was often the director throughout rehearsals.  Welles' alleged biological son Michael Lindsay-Hogg also worked on the play as an actor and as Edwards's personal assistant. Welles' opinion of Falstaff had intensified since first playing the part, and his new version of the play focused more upon the relationship between Falstaff and Prince Hal than on the historical story of Hal's defeat of Hotspur. Most of the scenes from Henry V used in the first version before were removed. Welles intended to perform the play in Belfast, Dublin and London before filming it in Yugoslavia.

Rehearsals for the play began in Russell Square, London, with a read-through. After a week of rehearsing, Welles left to secure further funding and Edwards directed the play, working on blocking and lighting. Welles returned a week before the premiere without having learned a line. The cast had their technical rehearsal the night before opening. which lasted until 8 a.m. the next morning. They never had a dress rehearsal or even a run-through and had never seen Welles without the book or in costume. After premiering at the Grand Opera House in Belfast on February 13, 1960, and receiving a good review from a Variety correspondent, it moved to the Gaiety Theatre in Dublin.  For two nights Orson did a one-man show, starting with readings of J.M Synge, Riders to the Sea, Moby Dick and the works of Isak Dinesen. The 2nd half was a TV show with questions from the audience. Afterwards it was revealed that the TV cameras were fake, just to attract an audience. Welles continued to adjust the play throughout its short production, and at one point moved Mistress Quickly's speech about Falstaff's death to the very beginning of the play. Welles finally abandoned the entire project in late March 1960, when his friend Laurence Olivier offered him the chance to direct him in Eugène Ionesco's play Rhinoceros on London's West End. According to Keith Baxter, Welles ended the play's run because he was bored with it, and at one point told Baxter "This is only a rehearsal for the movie, Keith, and I'll never make it unless you play Hal in that too." Five years later, Baxter and Welles' youngest daughter, Beatrice Welles, who played Falstaff's page, were the only cast members from the play to appear in the film. Chimes at Midnight was Welles' final performance in a theatrical play.

Production

Preproduction 

In 1964, Welles met and befriended Spanish film producer Emiliano Piedra, who wanted to work with him. Piedra did not think a Shakespearian film was marketable enough and proposed that Welles make a version of Treasure Island instead. Welles agreed  to this on condition that he could simultaneously make Chimes at Midnight, and Piedra agreed not knowing that Welles had no intention of making Treasure Island. Although some B-roll footage of the Alicante departing from port was shot early in the production, no scenes from Treasure Island were ever shot or even scripted. Welles got away with this trick throughout preproduction by building sets that could be used in both films, such as Mistress Quickly's Boar's Head Tavern, which would double as the Admiral Benbow Inn. Welles also cast each actor in both films, casting himself as Long John Silver, Baxter as Dr. Livesey, Beckley as Israel Hands and Gielgud as Squire Trelawney. Ironically, Welles would eventually play Long John Silver in the unrelated 1972 film version of Treasure Island.

Welles said that the Boar's Head Tavern was the only full set built for the film, and the other sets were simply dressed or decorated on location. Welles stated that he designed, painted and blow-torched the set, and designed all of the film's costumes. Early in pre-production Welles was approached by Anthony Perkins to play Prince Hal, but Welles had already promised the role to Keith Baxter. Hilton Edwards was initially cast as Justice Silence, but was replaced after he became ill. The title Chimes at Midnight derives from Henry IV, Part 2, where in response to Justice Shallow's reminiscing of their long-past school days, Falstaff states: "We have heard the chimes at midnight, Master Shallow". Welles scholar Bridget Gellert Lyons said that the film's title, "which is given further resonance by the repeated intoning of bells throughout the film, is associated for the audience with sadness and mortality more than youthful carousal."

Filming 

The film was shot in Spain from September 1964 until April 1965, with a break in filming from late December until late February. Welles' limitations on the film included a budget of $800,000 and actors Jeanne Moreau and John Gielgud being available for five and ten days respectively, while Margaret Rutherford was available for only four weeks. Welles later joked that during one scene that included seven principal characters, none of the actors was available and stand-ins were used for over-the-shoulder shots of all seven characters. Filming began in Colmenar and included all of John Gielgud's scenes. Welles then traveled to Cardona, where the Royal Court scenes and Marina Vlady's scenes were shot, and to Madrid's Casa de Campo Park, where the Gadshill robbery scene was filmed. Madrid was also the location of the Boar's Head Tavern set, where Welles shot Moreau's and Rutherford's scenes. The production then traveled to Pedraza for some outdoor street scenes, and then to Soria to shoot in the snow for the opening shots. After shooting some scenes with Justice Shallow and Justice Silence in the Basque country, Welles returned to Madrid in December to film the battle scenes in Casa de Campo Park for ten days.

The exploitation filmmaker Jesús "Jess" Franco worked as an assistant director for the film. He is not listed in the credits because he and Orson Welles had a falling out.

By late December, Welles had run out of money and the film was put on hold while he searched for additional funding. However, some small scenes were shot during the break. Welles later said that he had rejected offers for funding that were conditional upon filming in color. Welles eventually secured funding from Harry Saltzman and production officially resumed in late February with most of Keith Baxter's longer speeches and the Coronation scene in Madrid. Between March and April, Welles finished the film with filler shots, close-ups, the final rejection scene and most of Falstaff's speeches. According to Keith Baxter, Welles had stage fright and delayed all of his scenes until the very end of filming, except for scenes that included other actors. Welles was timid about shooting his love scene with Moreau, and used a double whenever possible. Other filming locations included the Chateau Calatañazor, Puerta de San Vincente, the Soria Cathedral and the city of Ávila. Welles was harsh with his crew members and according to actor Andrew Faulds, "he spoke in five different languages to them and was pretty offensivevery demanding. I suppose he'd worked out that if you bullied actors, you didn't get the best from them whereas, to hell with the technicians. They had to do as they were told, and pretty quick." A scene depicting the assassination of King Richard II, originally intended to open the film, was cut.

Post-production 

Keith Baxter said that the film's soundtrack was post-dubbed months after filming was completed, and that actors Fernando Rey and Marina Vlady were dubbed by different actors because of their heavy accents. Baxter also stated that he, Welles and Michael Aldridge recorded voices for several characters in post-production. Mistress Quickly's speech after Falstaff's death, which was disrupted by the audible hum of a power generator, used the original version of the soundtrack because Welles liked Margaret Rutherford's performance enough to keep it. The score was composed by Angelo Francesco Lavagnino, who had worked with Welles on Othello; it is notable for its prominent use of actual medieval monophonic dance tunes (and some later “early music,” such as several of Antony Holborne's Elizabethan consort pieces) at a time when this was anything but common. The score was recorded in an Italian studio, which paid Lavagnino for his work on the film in exchange for the rights to the music, and later released a soundtrack album in Italy and the UK. During the editing, Welles showed a rough cut to the visiting head of the Cannes Film Festival, who immediately wanted to include the film in the festival, and Welles had to finish the editing more quickly than he preferred.

Style

Cinematography 

Welles had originally wanted the entire film to use high-contrast cinematography, resembling engravings of the Middle Ages; only the opening title sequence uses this technique. The film's most famous sequence is the Battle of Shrewsbury; only about 180 extras were available and Welles used editing techniques to give the appearance of armies of thousands. Welles filmed all of the battle scenes in long takes, but cut the shots into fragments to create the effect that he wanted. It took ten days to shoot the scenes and six weeks to edit what became a six-minute sequence. In filming the sequence, Welles often used hand-held cameras, wide-angle lenses, slow motion and speed up shots, static shots, swish pans and constant rapid movement of the characters to create a kinetic and chaotic atmosphere. Anderegg has said that "in the end, both armies have become one huge, awkward, disintegrating war machine, a grotesque robot whose power source slowly begins to fail and finally comes to a frozen halt. Verbal rhetoric—language itself—seems, for the moment, both irrelevant and obscene."

The Battle of Shrewsbury sequence has often been called an anti-war statement by film critics and likened to contemporary films like Dr. Strangelove and Culloden. Shakespearean scholar Daniel Seltzer said that "the social consciousness of the movie is as alert as Shakespeare's, and thematically pertinent in Shakespearean terms too ... the footage of the Battle of Shrewsbury itself must be some of the finest, truest, ugliest scenes of warfare ever shot and edited for a movie." Welles scholar James Naremore said that "the underlying eroticism of the chivalric code ... is exposed in all its cruel perversity." Tony Howard wrote that Welles used Shakespeare's historical plays "to denounce modern political hypocrisy and militarism."

Sound 
Due to budgetary constraints, both the on-set and post-production sound was poorly recorded. Anderegg wrote that this, in combination with Welles' fast-paced camera movements and editing, makes the Shakespearean dialogue more difficult to understand. Many scenes are shot in long takes or with character's backs facing the camera, most likely for practical purposes when actors were not present, creating more sound problems. "In effect," Anderegg writes, "Welles generates a constant tension between what we see and what we hear, a tension that points to the ambiguous status of language in its relation to action." During the Battle of Shrewsbury sequence, Welles used a complex and layered soundtrack that included the sounds of swords and armor clanking, soldiers grunting and screaming, bones breaking, boots in the mud and the film's musical score to add to the chaos of the scene.

Interpretation of Shakespeare 

Welles' adaptation of five Shakespeare plays was not a chronological transcription of the original texts. Shakespearean scholar Kenneth S. Rothwell said that Welles "goes beyond mere tinkering with Shakespeare's scenes; [he] massively reworks, transposes, revises and deletes, indeed reconstructs them." These changes included taking lines of dialogue from one play and inserting them into scenes from another. Specific changes include a scene near the end of the film in which Hal pardons an imprisoned street rabble-rouser just before his expedition to invade France; Welles slightly altered this scene from Henry V, Act 2, Scene 2. In the film it is stated that this man is Falstaff, and that the incident he is pardoning is Falstaff's disturbance of Hal's coronation. Although both the pardoned prisoner and Falstaff are said to drink wine, Shakespeare does not imply that the pardoned prisoner is Falstaff. In both Chimes at Midnight and in Henry V, this scene is followed by Falstaff's death. The film contains no true soliloquies, since characters are never alone and do not speak directly to the audience during their speeches.  Henry IV is usually shown standing or sitting with very little action involvedthis, says Anderegg, makes it appear that he speaks only to himself even when others are present. Gielgud was known for his classical interpretation of Shakespeare, and his performance consists almost entirely of words, which are unable to defeat either Northumberland's rebels or Hal's wild behavior. Throughout the film, Falstaff, Hal, and Hotspur imitate Gielgud, mocking the words of Henry IV.

Reception

Critical response 
Chimes at Midnight premiered to a positive audience reception at the 1966 Cannes Film Festival. However, after New York Times critic Bosley Crowther's unfavorable advance review, American distributor Harry Saltzman decided to give the film little publicity and minimal distribution when it was released in the U.S. the next year. Critical reception on its first release was mostly negative; the film was not regarded as one of Welles' best until years later. Crowther criticized the film's poor audio track and called it "a confusing patchwork of scenes and characters ... designed to give major exposure to Jack Falstaff." Welles' performance, he said, was "a dissolute, bumbling street-corner Santa Claus." Penelope Houston called it "a film which seems to turn its back on brilliance." A Time review also criticized Welles, stating that "[he] is probably the first actor in the history of the theater to appear too fat for the role ... he takes command of scenes less with spoken English than with body English", but that he is "never entirely bad."

Judith Crist praised the film as "stark, simple, concentrating on word and performance, serv[ing] as a reminder of where the substance of the play lies." Pauline Kael also criticized the poor sound, but gave a favorable review overall, singling out the film's casting and calling Welles' performance "very rich, very full." She said the Battle of Shrewsbury sequence was "unlike any battle scene done on the screen before." Cahiers du Cinéma critic Serge Daney also praised both the film and Welles' ability to make great films on the subject of power. Welles was disappointed with the film's reception, complaining that "almost nobody has seen it in America, and that drives me nuts."

Legacy 

Welles held Chimes at Midnight in high regard. "It's my favorite picture, yes," he told interviewer Leslie Megahey in a 1982 interview for BBC Arena:

If I wanted to get into heaven on the basis of one movie, that's the one I would offer up. I think it's because it is to me the least flawed; let me put it that way. It is the most successful for what I tried to do. I succeeded more completely in my view with that than with anything else.Estrin, Mark W., and Orson Welles, Orson Welles: Interviews. Jackson, Mississippi: University Press of Mississippi, 2002.

He also considered it to be his most personal film, along with The Magnificent Ambersons. Many critics, including Peter Bogdanovich and Jonathan Rosenbaum, also consider Chimes at Midnight to be Welles' finest work. Several years after its initial release, film critic Vincent Canby of The New York Times wrote that Chimes at Midnight "may be the greatest Shakespearean film ever made, bar none." Joseph McBride has called it "Welles' masterpiece, the fullest, most completely realized expression of everything he had been working towards since Citizen Kane." In 2006, Roger Ebert praised the film as "a magnificent film, clearly among Welles' greatest work."

The Battle of Shrewsbury sequence has been particularly admired, and inspired later movies, including Braveheart and Saving Private Ryan. Film critics have compared it to the Odessa Steps sequence in Battleship Potemkin and the Battle on the Ice sequence in Alexander Nevsky, both directed by Sergei Eisenstein. Kenneth Branagh's Henry V used Welles' Battle of Shrewsbury sequence as an inspiration for the Battle of Agincourt, and depicted Prince Hal's rejection of Falstaff in a way that was more influenced by Chimes at Midnight than from more traditional interpretations of the scene. In 1988, director Patrick Garland staged a version of Chimes at Midnight starring Simon Callow as Falstaff at the Chichester Festival Theatre. Michael Anderegg said that Chimes at Midnights use of wide angle lenses, low-key lighting and costumes, and its focus on the relationship between Falstaff and Prince Hal influenced My Own Private IdahoGus Van Sant's 1991 loose adaptation of Henry IV Parts 1 and 2.

In 2011, Bonham's Auction House sold a large archive of Welles' material that had once belonged to the film's executive producer Alessandro Tasca di Cuto. Most of the material was from Chimes at Midnight, and included Welles' original art-work, photographs and memoranda. This collection was later donated to the University of Michigan for scholarly study.

In 2012, for the British Film Institute's Sight and Sound poll, 11 film critics and two directors voted Chimes at Midnight one of the 10 greatest films of all time, including McBride and Todd McCarthy.

Spanish writer and director of the Film Library of Catalonia Esteve Riambau published a book about the film called The Things We've Seen: Welles and Falstaff in 2015.

Awards 

At the 1966 Cannes Film Festival, Chimes at Midnight was screened in competition for the Palme d'Or and won the 20th Anniversary Prize and the Technical Grand Prize. Welles was nominated for a BAFTA award for Best Foreign Actor in 1968 In Spain, the film won the Citizens Writers Circle Award for Best Film in 1966.

Home media 

Because of legal disputes over the rights, Chimes at Midnight has been released only twice on VHS video in the United States, neither of which is currently available. Harry Saltzman's widow Adriana Saltzman, the families of producers Emiliano Piedra and Angel Escolano and the estate of Orson Wellesmaintained by Beatrice Welles among others have all claimed ownership of the film. For many years the only available source was a region-free DVD from Brazil. Mr Bongo Records screened a restored version in the UK at Picturehouse Cinemas on August 1, 2011. In February 2015,  the film was screened at the Sedona International Film Festival. Beatrice Welles attended and announced that "a major DVD/Blu-ray label is interested in restoring and releasing Chimes at Midnight." The pristine 35mm print was discovered  by Distribpix Inc., who said it was "in such great condition that it is begging for a full 4k scan restoration."

The film had a European release on DVD and Blu-ray on June 29, 2015.

2016 restoration 

Janus Films released a restored version of the film on D.C.P. that premiered on January 1, 2016, at Film Forum in New York City January 1–12, 2016 and Cinefamily in Los Angeles. This restored version is not derived from the Distribpix print. Peter Becker, Criterion's president, said that the release is the product of more than 20 years of effort: "There is no film we have waited longer for or worked harder to free up, and none we are prouder to present", he said. Criterion released this restoration on DVD and Blu-ray on August 30, 2016.

Welles and Falstaff

Welles' views on Sir John Falstaff 

Welles considered Falstaff to be "Shakespeare's greatest creation" and said that the role was "the most difficult part I ever played in my life." Keith Baxter believed that making the film was Welles' life's ambition. Before the 1939 Boston premiere of Five Kings, Welles told journalists "I will play him as a tragic figure. I hope, of course, he will be funny to the audience, just as he was funny to those around him. But his humor and wit were aroused merely by the fact that he wanted to please the prince. Falstaff, however, had the potential of greatness in him." Reviews for the 1939 play mention Welles' choice to downplay the traditional comedic elements of Falstaff in his performance. This reverence for the character increased over the years and by the time Welles made Chimes at Midnight, his focus was entirely on the relationships between Falstaff, Hal and Henry IV. He believed that the core of the story was "the betrayal of friendship." Welles called Hal's rejection of Falstaff "one of the greatest scenes ever written, so the movie is really a preparation for it. Everything prepares for it." Throughout the film, Hal repeatedly turns his back on Falstaff, foreshadowing the film's ending.

Welles said, "the film was not intended as a lament for Falstaff, but for the death of Merrie England. Merrie England as a conception, a myth which has been very real to the English-speaking world, and is to some extent expressed in other countries of the Medieval epoch: the age of chivalry, of simplicity, of Maytime and all that. It is more than Falstaff who is dying. It's the old England dying and betrayed." Many film theorists and Welles biographers have written about the recurrent theme of the "Lost Eden" in Welles' work and of characters who are nostalgic for an idealized past, which Welles called "the central theme in Western culture." Welles told Peter Bogdanovich that "even if the good old days never existed, the fact that we can conceive of such a world is, in fact, an affirmation of the human spirit." Film scholar Beverle Houston argued that this nostalgia made Welles' depiction of Falstaff infantile and called his performance a "[p]ower baby ... an eating, sucking, foetus-like creature." Welles also called Falstaff "the greatest conception of a good man, the most completely good man, in all of drama", and said that "the closer I thought I was getting to Falstaff the less funny he seemed to me. When I played him before in the theater, he seemed more witty than comical. And in bringing him to the screen, I found him only occasionally, and only deliberately, a clown."

Welles' personal connections to Sir John Falstaff 

Keith Baxter compared Welles to Falstaff, since they were both perpetually short of money, often lied and cheated people to get what they needed and were always merry and fun loving. Film scholar Jack Jorgens also compared Welles to Falstaff, stating that "to a man who directed and starred in a masterpiece and has since staggered through three decades of underfinanced, hurried, flawed films, scores of bit parts, narrations, and interviews which debased his talent, dozens of projects which died for want of persistence and financing, the story of a fat, aging jester exiled from his audience and no longer able to triumph over impossible obstacles with wit and torrential imagination might well seem tragic." When Joss Ackland played Falstaff on the stage in 1982, he said that he was more inspired by Welles than by Welles' performance as Falstaff, stating that "like Falstaff, I believe he could have achieved so much, but it was frittered away." Kenneth S. Rothwell has called Hal's rejection of Falstaff allegorical to Hollywood's rejection of Welles. Welles had become deeply depressed in the late 1950s after the disappointment of making Touch of Evil, his intended Hollywood come-back.

Welles' biographer Simon Callow has compared Falstaff to Welles' father Richard Head Welles, stating that like Falstaff, Welles' father was "a drunkard, a trickster, a braggart, a womanizer, a gentleman and a charmerand he is rejected by the person he loves the most." Welles' father was an alcoholic and womanizer who would often take a teenage Welles along with him when he was indulging in his vices. Welles observed his father much like Falstaff is observed by Hal and depends on his young protégé to bail him out of trouble. The love triangle between Prince Hal and his two father figures, Henry IV and Falstaff, is also similar to Welles' relationships with his father and the two men who became surrogate fathers to him: family friend Dr. Maurice Bernstein and Todd School for Boys headmaster Roger Hill. Both of Welles' surrogate fathers disapproved of Richard Welles' life-style and negative influence on Welles. When the younger Welles turned fifteen, he took the advice of Roger Hill and told his father that he would not see him again until he cleaned up his act and stopped drinking; Welles' father died shortly afterwards, alone and lonely, and Welles always blamed himself for his father's death, stating, "I always thought I killed him."

Welles' alleged biological son Michael Lindsay-Hogg, who was born out of wedlock to Welles and actress Geraldine Fitzgerald, first met Welles when he was 15 and later worked on the 1960 stage play Chimes at Midnight. This was the only significant amount of time that the two spent together and afterwards Lindsay-Hogg only saw Welles sporadically. Like Welles, Lindsay-Hogg had two surrogate fathers in addition to his biological father. In the late 1950s when she was sixteen years old, Welles' eldest daughter Christopher Welles Feder cut off all ties with Welles under pressure from her mother, who disapproved of Welles' influence on her. Welles and Feder later reconnected but their relationship never fully recovered. Welles' youngest daughter Beatrice, who resembled her father as a young boy, appears in the film version of Chimes at Midnight.

See also

References

Bibliography

External links 
 
 
 
 
 
 Roger Ebert "Great Movies" review
 Wellesnet.com, the Orson Welles Web Resource, articles on the film
Chimes at Midnight: Falstaff Roars an essay by Michael Anderegg at the Criterion Collection

1960s war comedy-drama films
1966 films
Biographical films about military leaders
Spanish black-and-white films
1960s English-language films
English-language Spanish films
Drama films based on actual events
Films based on Henry IV (play)
Films based on Henry V (play)
Films based on Richard II (play)
Films directed by Orson Welles
Films set in the 1400s
Films set in London
Films shot in Barcelona
Films shot in Madrid
Films shot in Spain
Films with screenplays by Orson Welles
War films based on actual events
Swiss war drama films
Spanish war drama films
Wars of the Roses
Films based on multiple works
Films produced by Harry Saltzman
Films shot in the province of Ávila
Films scored by Angelo Francesco Lavagnino
1966 comedy-drama films